Pennsylvania State Senate District 15 includes part of Dauphin County. It is currently represented by Republican John DiSanto.

District profile
The district includes the following areas:

 Conewago Township
 Dauphin
 Derry Township
 East Hanover Township
 Harrisburg
 Highspire
 Hummelstown
 Londonderry Township
 Lower Paxton Township
 Lower Swatara Township
 Middle Paxton Township
 Middletown
 Paxtang
 Penbrook
 Royalton
 South Hanover Township
 Steelton
 Susquehanna Township
 Swatara Township
 West Hanover Township

Senators

Recent election results

References

Pennsylvania Senate districts
Government of Dauphin County, Pennsylvania
Government of Perry County, Pennsylvania